Jawahar Point or  Jawahar Sthal is a region near the Shackleton Crater where the Moon Impact Probe struck the surface of the Moon. It was named to mark the event of the Moon Impact Probe striking the lunar surface after being released from India's first lunar orbiter mission Chandrayaan-1 as it was designed to do. The Moon Impact Probe crash-landed on the lunar surface on 14 November 2008, the birthday of former Prime Minister Jawaharlal Nehru, near the Shackleton crater.

See also
Chandrayaan-1

References

Indian lunar exploration programme
Monuments and memorials to Jawaharlal Nehru